Thomas James Dunbabin DSO (12 April 1911 – 31 March 1955), was an Australian classicist scholar and archaeologist of Tasmanian origin, as well as a renowned WWII soldier in Crete.

Early life
He was born in Hobart, Tasmania, on 12 April 1911. His father was Thomas Dunbabin (1883–1973), a distinguished journalist and a contributor to Walkabout.

He attended Sydney Church of England Grammar School where he won the Cooper Prize and was a school prefect. He shared the Burke Prize for highest general proficiency in his school in 1926 and in that year achieved first class honours in English, Latin and Greek.

He studied at the University of Sydney and then moved to Corpus Christi College, Oxford. There, he won the Haigh prize and was eventually appointed Reader in Classical Archaeology and Fellow of All Souls College, specializing in the Greek colonization in Italy.

He was the assistant director of the British School of Archaeology at Athens in 1936 when he became engaged to Adelaide Doreen Delacour, the daughter of the Bishop of Knaresborough. They married the following year and they went on to have two children, a son and a daughter.

Military service
During World War II, he attained the rank of lieutenant colonel as a SOE Field Commander behind enemy lines in occupied Crete. He was, from 1942, the senior British liaison officer with the resistance and it was during this period he earned his DSO. He used the Greek codename Yanni and was also known to locals as Tom. His role was made more difficult by the rivalry between various Greek resistance groups. Those he worked with on the island included Patrick Leigh Fermor, John Pendlebury, Manolis Paterakis, Sandy Rendel, and Dennis Ciclitira.

One of the operations carried out was the capture of General Heinrich Kreipe in April 1944. His obituary in the Times notes his finest achievement was using his influence to keep peace between various partisan groups and is credited with saving the island from the turmoil experienced on the mainland during the Greek Civil War.

Post-war career
He returned to Oxford after the war where in 1945 he became a Reader in classical archaeology under Sir John Beazley. In 1952 as a Leverhulme Research Follow he travelled widely to examine artefacts indicating oriental influence on Greek culture of the 7th century. This resulted in his book, The Western Greeks; The History of Sicily and South Italy from the Foundation of the Greek Colonies to 480 B.C. (1948). 

Dunbabin died from pancreatic cancer on 31 March 1955, twelve days before his 44th birthday. He was survived by his wife and two children, as well as, among other relatives, his father.

See also 
George Doundoulakis
Helias Doundoulakis

References

External links
Review of "The Western Greeks" by T.J. Dunbabin

1911 births
British Army General List officers
British Army personnel of World War II
Companions of the Distinguished Service Order
Special Operations Executive personnel
Cretan Resistance
1955 deaths
Crete in World War II
Australian archaeologists